General Alvear is the head city of the General Alvear Department, Mendoza in Mendoza Province, Argentina.

Founded on August 12, 1914, it currently has a population of 29,909, and its UN/LOCODE is ARGVA.

It should not be confused with the General Alvear in Buenos Aires Province.

Name
The city is named after General Carlos María de Alvear (1789-1852)

Notable people
 Evelia Edith Oyhenart (1955-2021), anthropologist

External links

 
 General Alvear portal 
 General Alvear .Mendoza.   

Populated places in Mendoza Province
Populated places established in 1914
1914 establishments in Argentina
Cities in Argentina
Argentina
Mendoza Province